Anne Phillips  (born 2 June 1950), is Emeritus Professor of Political Theory at the London School of Economics (LSE), where she was previously Graham Wallas Professor of Political Science. She was elected a Fellow of the British Academy in 2003.

Profile
Anne Phillips joined the LSE in 1999 as Professor of Gender Theory, and was Director of the Gender Institute until September 2004. She subsequently moved to a joint appointment between the Gender Institute and Government Department. She is a leading figure in feminist political theory, and writes on issues of democracy and representation, equality, multiculturalism, and difference. Much of her work can be read as challenging the narrowness of contemporary liberal theory.

In 1992, she was co-winner of the American Political Science Association's Victoria Schuck Award for Best Book on Women and Politics published in 1991 (awarded for Engendering Democracy). She was awarded an honorary Doctorate from Aalborg University in 1999; was appointed adjunct professor in the Political Science Programme of the Research School of Social Sciences, Australian National University, 2002–6.

Research projects
In 2002–4, she carried out a Nuffield funded research project on tensions between sexual and cultural equality in the British courts.

She later worked with Sawitri Saharso, Vrije Universiteit (Free University), Amsterdam, on a cross European collaboration (also funded by Nuffield) that has explored issues of gender and culture in their specifically European context. This involved two conferences, one in London in 2005 and the other in Amsterdam in 2006, and led to a special issue of the journal Ethnicities (2008).

Selected bibliography

Books 
  Second edition 1998.
 Swedish translation Narvarons Politik Studentlitteratur, 2000.
 Italian translation of Chapter 2 published in Info/Quaderni VI, n. 7-9, 18 December 2000
 
 
 ; see Multiculturalism without culture
 
Phillips, Anne (2015). The Politics of the Human. Cambridge: Cambridge University Press. .
 Phillips, Anne (2021). Unconditional Equals. Cambridge, Cambridge University Press.

Chapters in books 
 'Multiculturalism, Universalism and the Claims of Democracy' in M. Molyneux and S. Razavi (eds) Gender Justice, Development and Rights, OUP, 2002, pp. 115–118.
 'Recognition and the Struggle for Political Voice' in Barbara Hobson (ed) Recognition Struggles and Social Movements: Contested Identities, Agency and Power, Cambridge University Press, 2003, pp. 263–272.
 'Dilemmas of Gender and Culture: the judge, the democrat and the political activist' in A. Eisenberg & J. Spinner Halev (eds) Minorities within Minorities: Equality, Rights and Diversity, Cambridge University Press, 2005, pp. 113–134
 'What is Culture?' in Barbara Arneil; Monique Deveaux; Rita Dhamoon & Avigail Eisenberg (eds) Sexual Justice/Cultural Justice: Critical Perspectives in Political Theory and Practice, Routledge, 2006..

Journal articles

Other publications
 Feminism and Politics, collection of readings with introduction. Oxford Readings in Feminism, series editors Teresa Brennan and Susan James, Oxford University Press, 1998, pp. 471.
 Democracy and Difference, Polity Press and Pennsylvania State University Press, 1993, pp. 175.
 Destabilising Theory: Contemporary Feminist Debates, co-edited with Michele Barrett, Polity Press and Stanford University Press, 1992, pp. 224. Second English edition, 1998; Mexican edition, 1999.
 Engendering Democracy, Polity Press and Pennsylvania State University Press, 1991, pp. 183. (Co-winner of American Political Science Association's Victoria Schuck Award for Best Book on Women and Politics published in 1991).
 Spanish edition, 1994; German edition 1995; Turkish edition, 1995; Mexican edition, 1996; second English edition, 1997; Croatian edition 2000; Slovenian edition, 2002.
 The Enigma of Colonialism: British Policy in West Africa, Indiana University Press and James Currey, 1989, pp. 184.
 Divided Loyalties: Dilemmas of Sex and Class, Virago Press, 1987, pp. 192.
 Feminism and Equality (edited readings with an introductory essay), Blackwell Publishing and New York University Press, 1987, pp. 202.
 Hidden Hands: Women and Economic Policies, Pluto Press, 1983, pp. 116.

Other essays

 "Identity Politics: Have We Now Had Enough?" in J. Andersen and B. Siim (eds) The Politics of Inclusion and Empowerment: Gender, Class and Citizenship, Palgrave Macmillan, 2004, pp. 36–48.
 "La politique identitiaire: faut-il tourner la page?" in Jacqueline Heinen (ed) L'Egalite, une Utopie? Cahiers du Genre no. 33, L'Harmattan, Paris, 2002, pp. 43–62.
 "Que tiene que ver el socialismo con la igualdad sexual?" in R. Gargarella and F. Overjero (eds) Razones para el Socialismo, Paidos, Barcelona, 2002. (Spanish translation of 'What has Socialism to be with Sexual Equality?', 1997)
 "Does Feminism Need a Conception of Civil Society?" in Will Kymlicka and Simone Chambers (eds) Alternative Conceptions of Civil Society, Princeton University Press, 2002, pp. 71–89
 "Feminism and the Politics of Difference. Or, Where Have All the Women Gone?" in Susan James and Stephanie Palmer (eds) Visible Women: Essays in Feminist Legal Theory and Political Philosophy, Hart, 2002, pp. 11–28.
 "Politics in Isolation? Recent Developments in Political Theory" in A. B. Bakan and E. MacDomald (eds) Critical Political Studies: Debates and Dialogues from the Left, McGill-Queen's University Press, 2002, pp. 350–367.
 "Representation Renewed", in Marian Sawer and Gianna Zappala (eds) Speaking for the People: Representation in Australian Politics, Melbourne University Press, 2001, pp. 19–35.
 "Not As Individuals But In Pairs: review essay on Charles Tilly's Durable Inequality", Theory, Culture and Society, 18/4, 2001, pp. 123–127.
 "Feminism and Liberalism Revisited: Has Martha Nussbaum Got It Right?", Constellations, 8/2, 2001, pp. 249–266.
 "Representing difference: why should it matter if women get elected?" in Anna Coote (ed) New Gender Agenda IPPR, London 2000, pp. 58–65.
 "Feminism and Republicanism: Is this a plausible alliance?", Journal of Political Philosophy 8/2 2000, pp. 279–293. Translated into Spanish as 'Feminismo y republicanismo' In Nuevos Ideas Republicanas. Edited by F. Overjero; J. L. Marti; R. Gargarella. R. Paidos Estado y Soceidad, 2004, pp. 263–285.
 "Equality, Pluralism and Justice: Current Concerns in Normative Theory", British Journal of Politics and International Relations, 2/2, 2000, pp. 237–255.
 "Second Class Citizenship" in N. Pearce & J. Hallgarten (eds) Tomorrow's Citizens, London: IPPR, 2000, pp. 36–42.
 "La rappresentanza rinnovata" in S. Bianchi (ed) Emily: come elegger piu donne Reset, Italy, 1999, pp. 119–140.
 'Who Needs Civil Society? A Feminist Perspective', Dissent, Winter 1999, pp. 56–61.
 'The Politicisation of Difference: Does this make for a more tolerant society?' in John Horton and Susan Mendus (eds) Toleration, Identity and Difference, Macmillan, 1999, pp. 126–145.
 'Descriptive Representation Revisited' in S. Lukes and S. Garcia (eds) The Quality of Citizenship: Social Inclusion versus Multiculturalism?, Editorial Siglio XXI, Spain, 1999.
 'Strategies de la difference: politique des idees ou politique de la presence?', Mouvements, 3, Mar-April 1999, pp. 92–101.
 'Democracy' in A. Jaggar and I.M. Young (eds) Blackwell Companion to Feminist Philosophy, Blackwell, 1998, pp. 511–519.
 'From Inequality to Difference: A Severe Case of Displacement?', New Left Review 224, July/August 1997, pp. 143–153.
 'What has Socialism to do with Sexual Equality' in Jane Franklin (ed) Equality, Institute for Public Policy Research, 1997, pp. 101–122. Also in Soundings 4, 1996; reprinted in Dissent, Winter 1997.
 'In Defence of Secularism' in Tariq Modood (ed) Church, State and Religious Minorities, Policy Studies Institute, 1997, pp. 23–30.
 'Why worry about multiculturalism?' Dissent, Winter 1996, pp. 57–63.
 'Why does Local Democracy matter?' in L. Pratchett and D. Wilson (eds) Local Democracy and Local Government, Macmillan, 1996, pp. 20–37.
 'Dealing with Difference: A Politics of Ideas or a Politics of Presence?' in S. Benhabib (ed) Democracy and Difference: Defining the Boundaries of the Political, Princeton University Press, 1996 pp. 139–152.
 'Feminism and the Attractions of the Local' in D. King and G.Stoker (eds) Rethinking Local Democracy, Macmillan, 1996, pp. 111–129.
 'Democracy and Representation. Or, Why should it matter who our representatives are?' Frauen and Politik. Schweizerisches Jahrbuch fur Politische Wissenschaft (Swiss Year Book on Politics) no. 34, 1994, pp. 63–76.
 'Local Democracy: the terms of debate' Commission for Local Democracy, Research Report no 2, London 1994, p. 22.
 'Whose Community? Which Individuals?' in D. Miliband (ed) Reinventing the Left, Polity Press, 1994, pp. 123–127.
 'Dealing with Difference: A Politics of Ideas or a Politics of Presence?' Constellations 1, 1994, pp. 74–91. Reprinted in R. Goodin and P. Pettit (eds) Contemporary Political Philosophy: an Anthology Blackwell, 1997 pp. 174–184.
 'Pluralism, Solidarity and Change' in J. Weeks (ed) The Lesser Evil and the Greater Good, Rivers Oram Press, 1994, pp. 235–252
 'Must Feminists Give Up on Liberal Democracy?' Political Studies XL, 1992, pp. 68–82. Also published in David Held (ed) Prospects for Democracy, Polity Press, 1992. Translated in Carme Castells (ed) Perspectivas feministas en teoria politica, Paidos, Spain, 1996.
 'Universal Pretensions in Political Thought' in M. Barrett and A. Phillips (eds) Destabilising Theory: Contemporary Feminist Debates, Polity Press and Stanford University Press, 1992, pp. 10–30.
 'Democracy and Difference: Some problems for feminist theory', The Political Quarterly, 63(1), 1992, pp. 79–80. Reprinted in W. Kymlicka (ed) The Rights of Minority Cultures, Oxford University Press, 1995; also in Thomas Christiano (ed) Philosophy and Democracy, Oxford University Press, 2003.
 'Women in the UK and Republic of Ireland: Qualitative or Quantitative Change?' in R. Furst Dilic (ed) Women of Europe Towards the Year 2000: Agents for Changing Structures and Values, Centre European de Coordination de Recherche et de Documentation en Sciences Sociales in association with UNESCO, 1991.
 'So What's Wrong With The Individual? Socialism, Feminism, Equality' in P. Osborne (ed) Socialism and the Limits of Liberalism, Verso 1991, pp. 139–160.
 'Citizenship and Feminist Theory' in G. Andrews (ed) Citizenship, Lawrence and Wishart, 1991, pp. 76–88.
 'Fraternity' in Ben Pimlott (ed) Fabian Essays in Socialist Thought, Heinemann, 1984, pp. 230–241. Translated in Ensayos Fabianos Sobre Pensiamento Socialisto, Ministerio de Trabajo y Seguridad Social, Spain, 1988. Reprinted in Gordon Brown and Tony Wright (eds) Values, Visions and Voices: a Socialist Anthology, Mainstream Publishing Co. Ltd, Edinburgh, 1995.
 'Marxism and Feminism' in Feminist Anthology Collective (ed) No Turning Back, The Women's Press, 1981, pp. 90–98.
 'Sex and Skill' (with Barbara Taylor) Feminist Review no. 6, 1980, pp. 79–88. Reprinted in Feminist Review (ed) Waged Work: A Reader, Virago Press, 1986; also reprinted in J.Scott (ed) Feminism and History, OUP, 1996.
 'The Concept of Development', Review of African Political Economy no 8, 1977, p. 7–20.

References

External links
 Anne Phillips - LSE Experts entry

1950 births
Academics of the London School of Economics
British political philosophers
Feminist theorists
Living people
Fellows of the British Academy